is a Japanese artistic gymnast. Born in Okayama, Japan, he graduated from Nippon Sport Science University and later join Tokushukai Gymnastics Club. Yunoki has represented Japan at several FIG World Cup competitions.

See also 
 Japan men's national gymnastics team

References

External links 
 Kentaro Yunoki at FIG website

Japanese male artistic gymnasts
Sportspeople from Okayama Prefecture
Living people
1997 births